"Ain't No Stopping Us Now" is a song co-written and recorded by American country music artist Kane Brown. It was released on June 18, 2016 as a promotional single from his 2016 self-titled debut album. Brown wrote the song with Jamie Paulin and Jordan Schmidt.

Content
The song describes the narrator celebrating the summer, mentioning road trips and the beach.

Critical reception
Markos Papadatos of the Digital Journal gave the song a favorable review, rating it 4.5 out of 5 stars and comparing Brown's baritone vocal to that of Tyler Hubbard (from Florida Georgia Line) and Chris Young. He concluded his review by writing "Overall, Kane Brown shows his exceptional talent on "Ain't No Stopping Us Now."

Commercial performance
The song has sold 49,000 copies in the United States as of July 2016.

Chart performance

References

2016 songs
2016 singles
Kane Brown songs
RCA Records Nashville singles
Songs written by Kane Brown
Songs written by Jordan Schmidt